Luigi or Louis Rubio (Rome, between 1797 and 1808 – Florence, 2 August 1882) was an Italian painter, active in both Neoclassicism but later Romantic styles, painting mainly historic-mythologic canvases, as well as some genre subjects, and portraits. His works harked back to the Troubadour style twenty years earlier.

Biography
He was a resident of Rome. He studied as a young man at the Academy of San Luca, and there won the Canova prize. In 1823 he moves to study at the Institute of Fine Arts of Parma: here he won a prize for his Priam at the feet of Achilles. In 1824 at Rome, his canvas of The Samaritan won the Pio Clementine Prize, two gold medals, and granted him a pension of 15 scudi monthly for three years, paid by the papal government under Pope Leo XII. In 1827 he was nominated honorary academic at the Academy in Rome.  From 1827-1830, he was commissioned to work for the Count Zamoyski, President of the Senate at Warsaw, Poland.

In 1830-1848, he moved to Paris.
His major painting Paolo and Francesca was a highly finished and detailed canvas exhibited at the Paris Salon of 1833, whose colours harked back to those of the turn of the 19th century. Its composition owes much to other depictions of the episode, such as Ingres' many versions, Coupin de la Couperie's painting (1812, purchased by Josephine Bonaparte) and  19th-century engravings.
At the 1836 Exposition there, he displayed a canvas depicting Marriage of Salvator Rosa on his Deathbed; and he won a gold medal a number of commissions for the Museum of Versailles, which was being opened by King Louis Philippe I. At Paris, in addition to portraits, he painted canvases for the Russian Chapel, and a canvas for the church of the contessa Malacoska; another for the Catholic Church of Moscow, a Christ, Saints Peter and Paul. In 1842, he won silver medal at the Exposition at Alençon. In 1843, he won the silver medal at the Exhibition of Boulogne sur-Mer for his portraits. In 1849, Pope Pius IX raised him to equestrian rank in the order of San Silvestro. In 1862 named knight of the Order of Saints Maurizio and Lazzaro. In 1870 he was nominated professor of the Academy of Fine Arts of Florence and in 1862, his self-portrait was added to the hall of painters at the Uffizi Gallery in Florence.

He was also awarded a prize by Abdülmecid I, for whom Rubio crafted a portrait while in Istanbul. In 1853 he was elected professor at the Academy of Fine Arts of St Petersburg. In 1867 he made painted an icon of San Stanislaus sent to Tsar Alexander II, after decorating the Russian church in Geneva.

Among his later works are: Donna che attinge acqua al fonte (1844); The painter Rubens persuades young Van Dyck to leave the Flemish village of Saventhem, where he had stayed for the love of a young woman (1851); Costumes from the surroundings of Rome(1861); Una filatrice (1861); Shepherds of the Roman Campagna (1861); Contadina che fila (1861); The Charity (1863); Neapolitan Fishermen (1863); Episode from the 1174 Siege of Ancona (1866); and a Portrait of Marcello (1870), the famous classical music composer.

References

1795 births
1882 deaths
19th-century Italian painters
Italian male painters
Italian neoclassical painters
19th-century Italian male artists